Mark Oliphant College is a public school in the northern suburbs of Adelaide, South Australia. It teaches students from birth to year 12 and is named after Sir Mark Oliphant.

Mark Oliphant College opened in the newly developed area of Munno Para during 2011, after having used two of the former sites since the beginning of 2010. It combined the students from the former Smithfield Plains High School, Smithfield Plains Primary School, Junior Primary and Kindergarten, all having been in the next suburb south, Smithfield Plains.

The school buildings are arranged in a circle around a village green which is occasionally used for communal gatherings and as a cricket field for the primary years. The village green features ten paved tennis courts, a full-sized AFL oval and two full-sized soccer pitches to facilitate physical education. 

The previous Mark Oliphant College campuses (colloquially known as "Old MOC") in Smithfield Plains have now been demolished and the land has been cleared for housing developments. The majority of Mark Oliphant College's senior teaching staff started their careers at Smithfield Plains High School.

Sub Schools 
Mark Oliphant College consists of 4 sub-schools each with their own principal and leadership team.

Early years is the first sub-school. Its uniform is red and it runs from reception to year 2. The sub-school is made up of Buildings 2, 6 and 8, the sub-school enrolls 260 students.

Primary years is the following sub-school. Its uniform is red and identical to early years; it runs from years 3 to 6. The sub-school is made up of Buildings 2, 9 and 10. The sub-school enrolls 333 students.

The Middle Years Sub School comprises Secondary Years 7–9. The Sub School wears a Navy Polo uniform and enrolls 386 students.

Senior years is the final sub-school. Its uniform is white and it runs through years 10 to 12. The sub-school is made up of Buildings 11, 12, 13, 14, 15, 16, 17, 18, 19 and 20. The sub-school enrolls 397 students.

References

Public schools in South Australia